Camino is a comune (municipality) in the Province of Alessandria in the Italian region Piedmont, located about  east of Turin and about  northwest of Alessandria.

Camino borders the following municipalities: Gabiano, Mombello Monferrato, Morano sul Po, Palazzolo Vercellese, Pontestura, Solonghello, and Trino.

Demographic evolution

Castello di Camino 
The Castello di Camino dates from the 11th century and has one of the highest medieval towers in the Monferrato area. The castle belonged to the Bishop of Asti up until the 13th century and was later administered by the Marquis of Monferrato. From 1323 to 1950, the castle belonged to the Scarampi family from Villanova. Vittorio Emanuele II, Umberto I and Vittorio Emanuele III of Savoy were guests at the castle. Benito Mussolini inaugurated the Monferrato aqueduct from the castle balcony.

Gallery

References

Cities and towns in Piedmont